The Biloxi Yacht Club (BYC) is located in Biloxi, Mississippi, USA, on the shores of the Mississippi Sound. The BYC is a founding member of the Gulf Yachting Association, as well as the Mississippi Coast Yachting Association. Established in 1849, it is the fourth oldest yacht club in the United States.

Club history
While it was previously thought the Biloxi Yacht Club was established in 1888, additional research undertaken by the Club in 2000 revealed a much earlier date, at least 1849. From the Biloxi Yacht Club resolution:

The New Orleans papers discussed the Race of 1849 and subsequent races of the period, going into great detail about the Race of 1849, since the Biloxi Regatta Club, in a precursor to today's rivalry between Gulf of Mexico and Lake Pontchartrain racing circuits, was excluding from its regatta any boat that won two first place finishes, thus unfairly eliminating what the Lake folks thought were the leading boats of the time.
On August 8, 1849, the Race of 1849 was held by the Biloxi Regatta Club with Undine of Mobile, Alabama, owned by the Honorable J. W. Lescene, taking a first, and Mary Ann, owned by James & Co., taking a second, and Biloxi's own Flirt, owned by A. B. Cammack coming in third, so that by that date it is certain that what has become known in modern times as the Biloxi Yacht Club, was already in existence.

The mid-19th century was remembered also as the organizational time for Gulf sailing activities. With many families along the coast owning yachts—a vessel with sails, emphasized a Down South magazine story in its May–June, 1976, issue — a group of men met in Pass Christian in 1849 and formed the Southern Yacht Club Association. A clubhouse was erected that same year at West End on Lake Pontchartrain. Southern Yacht Club at once gave sailing the impetus it needed. Soon, members were sailing their yachts from New Orleans to Point Clear, Alabama, Eastern Shore Yacht Club, and also organized races between these points. As Biloxi was a thriving city midway between Mobile and New Orleans, its importance in yachting history was assured. The seafood cannery owners saw in the visitors' regattas a means of using their large fleets of schooners during the off season. Their fasted boats were finely tuned and raced, leading to a regular weekend schedule of races through the months of July and August.

The following description of the clubhouse is from an early account found in a booklet given to the Biloxi Library by the late Jacinto Baltar, a prominent businessman, banker and civic leader.

The clubhouse is built on a foundation set in 10 feet of water directly opposite the Montross Hotel. A long pier connects the clubhouse with the shore. The building consists of four stories. On a level with the pier are the bathhouses and on either side of them are galleries with stairways leading down into the water. The second floor is reached by a stairway on the outside of the building, leading up directly from the end of the pier. Entering the hall, facing South, the reading room is on the left and the handsome ladies' parlors on the right. Directly behind these rooms and extending the full with of the building is the lounging room. The furniture is handsome in design and finish and lends an air of attractiveness to the apartment. The ladies' parlors are cozy laces, and are provided with every convenience. Behind the lounging room is a broad, long gallery, which accommodates 500 observers. From it one has a full view of the club's 15-mile course in the Mississippi Sound. The 3rd floor (when finished) will be devoted to billiard rooms and the 4th story, reached by a winding stair, is the observation tower. From it the Judges with the aid of glasses have a full sweep of the Sound and can easily follow the movements of the yachts.

At last, there were serene years ahead for BYC. But it was only the calm before the storm. The eye of a hurricane passed over the club in 1915, leaving only splintered pilings and a reminder of the once-lavish yachting showplace. Again, in July 1916, a hurricane brushed the club, but the new edifice, built just east of the old clubhouse with similar lines, stood tall. Saved, for the most part, was BYC's $3,500 clubhouse investment! "The only loss," Quave reported, "was loose lumber and tools amounting to $250".

A charter member of the Southern Gulf Coast Yachting Association on April 28, 1901, along with Bay Waveland, Mobile, Southern and Pass Christian, BYC found itself cast in that role again in 1920. As competition increased first among neighboring and then more distant clubs, pressure built to organize for the purpose of scheduling regattas the breadth of the Gulf Coast. In 1920 the Gulf Yachting Association was born. It also was proposed that a boat be designed and adopted by each club for club competition in order for all to compete evenly. A  gaff-rigged keel sloop was the result, designed by Commodore J. Rathbone deBuys of Southern Yacht Club and to be known as a "Fish Boat". The popular sloop remained the official competitive boat of the GYA until 1967 when high maintenance and replacement costs nudged member clubs into retiring the "Fish Class" in favor of a fiberglass equivalent. Eventually, after much heated debate between Fish Class sentimentalists and those proffering what they claimed was a more practical solution, the Flying Scot was accepted as the new GYA standard bearer.

It was not until 1969, however, that Biloxians would fully appreciate a hurricane. That was the year the BYC elected to renovate the now aging facility. The story could not be told more eloquently that by the historian Murfee in her Lee Sheet column:

This is the picture of the Biloxi Yacht Club that was indelibly etched in the minds of most of the members of the old yacht club -- this building, indestructible, standing tall and undaunted after the hurricane of 1947, surrounded on all sides by the rubble of buildings that once were neighbors. It had stood the test of time, having been rebuilt after the storm of 1915 and having weathered all that Nature had flung her way since that time.

It is small wonder that a group of energetic members were continuing their work remodeling the upper floor of the clubhouse for a gala opening that would feature and art exhibit and a fashion show in a large room suitable for meetings and other events while a storm, named Camille, was flirting along a path to the coast but until the last minute seemed to be headed for Panama City, Florida, that fateful day in August, 1969.

A different picture awaited the members on that grim morning after. The old familiar landmark was now gone forever. But the Biloxi Yacht Club would come back to life.

All the while the club stalwarts were considering their options, looking into all possibilities, and in time the El Capitan Lounge, swimming pool and marina of the Trade Winds Hotel became available. With some trepidation and much discussion, pro and con, the Biloxi Yacht Club, with an SBA 3% loan of $239,000 had a new home.

 In its colorful 100-odd year history BYC has had to make many decisions. None, however, caught the community more by surprise that the action taken by the board the year of Franklin Roosevelt's visit. In their pictorial history of "Biloxi and the Mississippi Gulf Coast," Colleen and Joe Scholtes report that after due deliberations the board, "banned the turkey trot and other newfangled dances in favor of the two-step and waltz."

In August, 2005, Hurricane Katrina destroyed the organizations clubhouse. A prominent local architect and long time club member Walter "Buzzy" Bolton, started the design of the new Biloxi Yacht Club and construction began in 2007. The new clubhouse opened in April 2009.

Past Commodores
Commodore	Year
Dr. Daniel A. Nash	1900 
Theodore P. Dulion	1901
Theodore P. Dulion	1902
Willard L. Via	        1903
Uylesse Desporte	1904
Ernest Desporte Sr.	1905
Theodore P. Dulion	1906
Willard L. Via	        1907
Isadore Heidenhem	1908
John J. Kennedy	        1909
Edward G. Grady	        1910
Edward G. Grady	        1911
Edward G. Grady	        1912
William P. Kennedy	1913
Julius M. Lopez Sr.	1914
Douglas Watson	        1915
Douglas Watson	        1916
Douglas Watson	        1917
John J. Kennedy	        1918
Thomas K. Devitt	1919
John A. Swanzy	        1920
Byrd Enochs	        1921
John P. Moore Jr.	1922
Dr. Albert A. Russ	1923
Edward F. Elmer	        1924
Francis G. Collins	1925
Edward F. Elmer	        1926
Wilberfance Leach	1927
Gaston J. Wiltz	        1928
Gaston J. Wiltz	        1929
Ernest Desporte	        1930
Ernest Desporte	        1931
G.E. Moore	        1932
Robert H. Pringle	1932
William L. Parks	1933
William P. Kennedy	1934
W.L. Barbour	        1935
Thomas N. Pringle	1935
Flournoy C. Goodman	1936
George B. Stounus	1937
E.W. Sadler	        1938
Dr. Eldon L. Bolton	1939
Alfred F. Dantzler	1940
Robert L. Brodie	1941
Dr. B.B. O'Mara	        1942
Wallace Chapman	        1943
Wallace Chapman	        1944
Wallace Chapman	        1945
Wallace Chapman	        1946
James W. Pringle	1947
Carl L. Matthes	        1948
Edward C. Tonsmeire	1949
John B. Joyce	        1950
Fred B. Ferson	        1951
Thom C. Kemp	        1952
Walter Seymour	        1953
Victor B. Pringle	1954
Phillip A. Joullian	1955
Curtis P. Sinkhorn	1956
L.V. Pringle Jr.	1957
Dr. Harry J. Schmidt Sr. 1958
W.W. Gillis	        1959
Feilding H. Staley	1960
William P. Kennedy, III	1961
Lawrence C. Corban	1962
J. Baltar Holland	1963
Charles Dixie Hollis	1964
Dr. Legrand J. Audioun	1965
Jerry J. Ellis	        1966
Emile J. Fallo Jr.	1967
Eugene A. Peresich Jr.	1968
Julius M. Lopez	        1969
Owen B. Munro	        1970
Owen B. Munro	        1971
Gerald J. Quave	        1972
Gerald J. Quave	        1973
Harry J. Joachim	1974
Robert J. Schmidt	1975
Strevey A. Williams	1976
John E. May Jr.	1977
James H. Neirynck	1977
James H. Neirynck	1978
William F. Wyatt	1979
Jerry J. Ellis	        1980
Jerry J. Ellis	        1981
Ralph Pringle	        1982*
Dr. William Pontius	1983
Clark D. Shaughnessey Jr.1984
Larry Manuel	        1985
Eddie Migues	        1986
Thomas Wiltz	        1987
Walter Bolton	        1988
Walter Bolton	        1989
Michael McDermott	1990
Harry J. Geller	        1991
Otto E. Larsen	        1992
Otto E. Larsen	        1993
William P. Kennedy IV	1994*
Lester Lala	        1995
Lester Lala	        1996
Winfield Scott	        1997
James Taylor	        1998
Mark Ederer	        1999
Gavin Schmidt	        2002
Richard C. Schmidt Jr.	2000
Robbie Schmidt	        2001*
Jude McDonnell	        2003
Jude McDonnell	        2004
Jerry J Ellis           2005

Third Generation

Regattas
Once every 7 years the club hosts the MCYA's Chapman Regatta and the GYA/MCYA's Race Week Regatta.

GYA's Gulf Ocean Racing Circuit

The Jerry Ellis Junior Regatta

The Biloxi Invitational Regatta

The Biloxi Mayor's Cup Regatta

Wednesday Night Racing

Sailing history
Organizing, reorganizing, building and rebuilding spacious club house facilities was a lot easier than establishing themselves as masters of the fine are of competitive sailing in the GYA the Biloxians were to discover. Perhaps that was because of their fiercely independent nature. "Biloxi fishermen neither know nor care anything about rules," Gerald Taylor White, famous for his America's Cup coverage, wrote in the 1926 The Rudder. "If a boat is in your way, you sail over her or through her at your own discretion." However, he added quickly, "For seamanship and snappy sail handling, we enter the Biloxi fishermen for world honors."

For 17 years BYC participated in what must have seemed an exercise in futility. Through 1936, seven clubs had figured in the win column, Pensacola, captor of the inaugural in 1920, sailing off with six Sir Thomas Jr. Lipton Interclub Challenge Series Victories. Other champions were Sarasota in 1930, 1931 and 1932, Eastern Shore, 1921, Southern Yacht Club, 1925, Mobile, 1928, and Buccaneer, 1934. In 1922 and again in 1927, Southern and Pensacola tied, and Eastern Shore and St. Petersburg wound up all even in 1926.

BYC's Junior Program, meanwhile enjoyed only brief period in the sun. After Southern's victories in the first two Junior Lipton Interclub Challenge Regattas, and a World War II-imposed four-year Series lapse, BYC's youngsters stormed back to capture the Lipton Cup in 1947, 1948 and 1949.

BYC's most notable team sailing achievement, it could be argued, came in an event to encourage the sport among women. In 1938, Commodore Bernie Knost of Pass Christian Yacht Club offered an elaborate trophy to the winner of an all-girl three-race interclub series hosted by his organization. The event was an immediate hit and has remained a highlight among Gulf sailing activities. With its large number of Skipperettes to draw from, most notable Joyce Fountain Wiltz, Janet Ferson Green, Beatrice Kennedy and Emily Joullian Dale, BYC over the years has compiled the second best record, winning the Knost nine times. Only Pass, with 11 victories, has done better. In addition to her Knost heroics, Joyce in 1949 became the first girl in the history of BYC to earn a skipper's position on the club's Lipton team.

The BYC also hosted several PHRF (Performance Handicapped Racing Fleet) events. The BYC was host to the GYA's Gulf Ocean Racing Series during the 1990s and early first decade of the 21st century, the GCYA (Gulf Coast Yachting Association) Round the Sound Series, which started at the Singing River Yacht Club (Pascagoula, MS) traveled to the Gulfport Yacht Club, and ended at the Biloxi Yacht Club. This series was transformed into the Biloxi Summer Series.  The club also hosted a Leukemia Cup and the GYA Offshore Race in 2002.

Off the race course, BYC also has an impressive record. Seven of its members have held the position of Gulf Yachting Association Commodore — Dr. Eldon Bolton, Wallace Chapman, Jerry J. Ellis, Byrd Enochs, J.J. Kennedy, J.P. Moore and Walter Seymour.

GYA past commodores
J.J. Kennedy, 1903
Byrd Enochs, 1921
J.P. Moore, 1922
Wallace Chapman, 1946
Walter Seymour, 1963
Eldon L Bolton, MD, 1973
Jerry J. Ellis, 1984

MCYA past elected commodores
Robbie Schmidt, 1998
Jerry Ellis, 2012

Notes

References
Shaughnessy, Jr., Clark D. - 1988, compiled from periodicals, personal records and recollections
New Orleans Picayune, August 9, 1849 - p1 col 4
Evening Picayune, August 10, 1849 - p2 col 5New Orleans Daily Crescent, September 7, 1849 - p2 c 1Daily Crescent, August 10, 1849 - p2 c 1Daily Crescent, August 7, 1849 - p2 c 2The SunHerald, April 3, 1994, by Mark SeghersThe SunHerald], November 4, 1996, by Tom WilemonAmerica's Oldest Yacht ClubsBYC History (1849 Resolution)BYC HistoryGulf Yachting Association 2009 DirectorySailing the Mississippi Coast''

External links
Gulf Yachting Association
Mississippi Coast Yachting Association
City of Biloxi

1849 establishments in Mississippi
Buildings and structures in Biloxi, Mississippi
Organizations based in Mississippi
Sailing in Mississippi
Yacht clubs in the United States